A Santa Cause: It's a Punk Rock Christmas was released November 11, 2003 on the label Immortal Records.  A percentage of the proceeds from the album's sale were donated to The Elizabeth Glaser Pediatric AIDS Foundation. A second edition, donating money to Cure Autism Now, was released in 2006.

Volume 1: track listing

The track listing on the back cover of Volume 1 is notable for several errors in the titles of songs and even the names of the bands. For example, "Christmas Night of the Living Dead" by MxPx is listed as "Christmas Night of Zombies", and Acceptance's cover of "Happy Xmas (War Is Over)" is listed as "So This Is Christmas".

Volume 2: track listing

A SANTA CAUSES-It's a Pop Rock Christmas

Japan also got a separate release titled A SANTA CAUSES-It's a Pop Rock Christmas. This album was only released in Japan or through Japanese online music stores. It was released in Japan on November 14, 2012 through Twilight Records. It is a single CD containing 20 tracks by various Japanese and American rock bands performing various Christmas songs. Unlike the other Santa Cause albums that contained both original songs and covers, this album contains all cover songs redone by other bands and artists.

Track listing

References

External links 
 

Pop punk compilation albums
2003 Christmas albums
Christmas compilation albums
2006 Christmas albums
Punk rock compilation albums
2003 compilation albums
2006 compilation albums